The 1986–87 Segunda División season saw 18 teams participate in the second flight Spanish league.

It was the longest season ever in Spanish football. The league was reduced to 18 teams and had two phases. In the first one all 18 teams played each other twice (home and away). At the end of the first phase, the first twelve teams qualified for promotion groups (Group A1 for teams that finished in an odd position and Group A2 for teams that finished in an even position) and the last six qualified for the relegation group (Group B). In the second phase, teams played only against teams of the same group twice (home and away) and carried their first phase record. Champions of promotion groups (Valencia CF and Celta de Vigo) and the best second placed team (CD Logroñés) were promoted to Primera División. The last three in the relegation group should have been relegated at the end of the season, but in the middle of the season it was decided that Primera División and Segunda División would be expanded to 20 teams. Finally, there were no relegations to Segunda División B.

Teams

First phase

Results

Second phase

Group A1 (Promotion)

Results

Group A2 (Promotion)

Results

Group B (Relegation) 
Since Primera and Segunda División would be expanded to 20 teams, no teams were relegated to Segunda División B.

Results

Pichichi Trophy for top goalscorers 
Last updated June 21, 2009

Segunda División seasons
2
Spain